Lizzie Largillière (born 26 April 1987) is a French kickboxer. She is the current ISKA World Kickboxing Super Flyweight champion.

She is the former WMC World Bantamweight champion, the former Enfusion 52 kg champion, and the former ISKA European Kickboxing Flyweight champion. At the amateur level she was the 2011 WAKO World and 2012 European gold medalist.

Kickboxing career
In 2011, Lizzie fought Iman Barlow during La Nuit du Kick Boxing. Barlow won a unanimous decision.

Largillière participated in the Enfusion Victory of the Vixen as a contender.

During Open des Yvelines de Muay Thai she fought Myriame Djedidi. Lizzie lost a unanimous decision. Fighting with Enfusion she won a unanimous decision against Isis Verbeek, and lost a unanimous decision to Ashley Nichols.

Largillière  won the ISKA European Flyweight title, with a unanimous decision against Gloria Peritore.

In 2015, Largillière won the WMC World Bantamweight title with a win over Petchoyding Mor.

During Enfusion 40 Lizzie faced Rita Marrero. She won a unanimous decision.

In 2017, she won the ISKA World Super Flyweight title with a decision win over Valeria Calabrese.

During Enfusion 68 she fought Lara Fernandez for the Enfusion 52 kg world title. Largillière  won the title by a unanimous decision.

Championships and accomplishments

Amateur titles
World Association of Kickboxing Organizations
 2011 WAKO Senior World Championships 52 kg
 2012 WAKO Senior European Championships 52 kg

Professional titles
International Sports Karate Association
ISKA World Full Contact Kickboxing Super Flyweight Championship (One time, current)
ISKA World Full Contact Kickboxing Super Flyweight Championships
World Muaythai Council
WMC World Bantamweight Championship
Enfusion
Enfusion 52 kg World Championship

Kickboxing record

|-  bgcolor=
|-  bgcolor="#CCFFCC"
| 6 Oct 2018 || Win||align=left| Lara Fernandez || Enfusion 68 || Newcastle, England || Decision (Unanimous) || 5 || 3:00|| 
|-
! style=background:white colspan=9 |
|-
|-  bgcolor="#CCFFCC"
| 21 Apr 2018 || Win||align=left| Roberta Sarcissela || Kick Boxing Championnat d'Europe || Sainte-Maxime, France || TKO || 2 ||  || 
|-
|-  bgcolor="#c5d2ea"
| 24 Mar 2018 || Draw||align=left| Emma Gongora || Louna Boxing || Château-Arnoux-Saint-Auban, France || Decision (Unanimous) || 3 || 3:00 || 
|-
|-  bgcolor="#FFBBBB"
| 13 Jan 2018 || Loss||align=left| Amel Dehby || Nuit Des Gladiateurs 9 || Marseille, France || Decision (Unanimous) || 3 || 3:00 || 
|-
|-  bgcolor="#FFBBBB"
| 9 Dec 2017 || Loss||align=left| Gloria Peritore || Bellator 190 || Florence, Italy || Decision (Unanimous) || 3 || 3:00 || 
|-
|-  bgcolor="#CCFFCC"
| 18 Mar 2017 || Win||align=left| Valeria Calabrese || ISKA World Title || Muret, France || Decision (Unanimous) || 5 || 3:00|| 
|-
! style=background:white colspan=9 |
|-
|-  bgcolor="#CCFFCC"
| 4 Jun 2016 || Win||align=left| Rita Marrero || Enfusion 40 || Gran Canaria, Spain || Decision (Unanimous) || 3 || 3:00|| 
|-
|-  bgcolor="#CCFFCC"
| 4 Aug 2015 || Win||align=left| Petchoyding Mor || Fight Night || Saint-Tropez, France || TKO || 4 || || 
|-
! style=background:white colspan=9 |
|-
|-  bgcolor="#CCFFCC"
| 16 May 2015 || Win||align=left| Gloria Peritore || La Nuit de l'Impact || Saintes, Charente-Maritime, France || Decision (Unanimous) || 5 || 3:00 || 
|-
! style=background:white colspan=9 |
|-
|-  bgcolor="#FFBBBB"
| 23 Nov 2014 || Loss||align=left| Ashley Nichols || Enfusion 22 || Groningen, Netherlands || Decision (Unanimous) || 3 || 3:00 || 
|-
|-  bgcolor="#CCFFCC"
| 4 Oct 2014 || Win||align=left| Isis Verbeek || Enfusion 21 || Ko Samui, Thailand || Decision (Unanimous) || 3 || 3:00 || 
|-
|-  bgcolor="#FFBBBB"
| 31 May 2014 || Loss||align=left| Myriame Djedidi || Open des Yvelines de Muay Thai || Trappes, France || Decision (Unanimous) || 3 || 3:00 || 
|-
|-  bgcolor="#FFBBBB"
| 18 May 2013 || Loss||align=left| Kalissa Houicha || Gala de Boxe Thaï à Nice || Nice, France || Decision (Split) || 3 || 3:00 || 
|-
|-  bgcolor="#CCFFCC"
| 27 Apr 2013 || Win||align=left| Jennifer Martinez || Championnat De France Boxe Thai || Château-Thierry, France || Decision (Unanimous) || 3 || 3:00 || 
|-
|-  bgcolor="#CCFFCC"
| 16 Mar 2013 || Win||align=left| Myriame Djedidi || Kick Imperator V - K1 Rules Explosion || L'Île-Rousse, France || Decision (Unanimous) || 3 || 3:00 || 
|-
|-  bgcolor="#FFBBBB"
| 26 Nov 2011 || Loss||align=left| Iman Barlow || La Nuit du Kick Boxing || Les Mureaux, France || Decision (Unanimous) || 3 || 3:00 || 
|-
|-
| colspan=9 | Legend:

See also
List of female kickboxers

List of female ISKA champions

References 

French kickboxers

1987 births
Living people
Sportspeople from Toulouse